The Queensland Country Rugby Union, or QCRU, is the governing body for the sport of rugby union within most of the state of Queensland in Australia. It is affiliated with the Queensland Rugby Union.

The Queensland Country Rugby Union administers the game in regions of Queensland outside of metropolitan Brisbane. The union is split into eleven country sub-unions. Queensland Country is represented by the Queensland Country Heelers team.

The Queensland Country Rugby Union has eleven country sub-unions, each running their own club competitions during the year. The sub-unions are grouped into three regional divisions in Northern, Central, and Southern Queensland:

North Queensland
Far North Queensland Rugby Union
Townsville and Districts Rugby Union
 Mount Isa
 Mackay

Central Queensland
 Rockhampton
 Central Highlands
 Western Queensland
 Wide Bay – selected from Bundaberg and District Rugby Union, plus teams from Fraser Coast, Gympie, and South Burnett.

South Queensland
Sunshine Coast Rugby Union
 Darling Downs Rugby Union
Gold Coast District Rugby Union

Sub-union teams compete in Regional Championships against other teams in their regional division. Representative sides from the three regions are then selected to play at the Queensland Country Championships.

Following the Country Championships, a representative Queensland Country Heelers team is selected by the Queensland Country Rugby Union to play regular fixtures including City-Country matches against Brisbane selections, and the "Battle of the Borders" Cup against the New South Wales Country Cockatoos.

Rugby Bundaberg 
 The Waves Falcons
 Bundaberg Barbarians
 Turtles Brothers Rugby
 Isis Crushers
 Bundaberg Pythons

Far North Queensland Rugby Union
 Cairns Northern Beaches Rugby Union (Mudcrabs)
 Barron-Trinity Bulls
 Brothers Rugby Union (Cairns)
 Cairns Old Crocs Rugby Union
 Cairns Wanderers
 Innisfail Chargers Junior Rugby Union
 JCU Mariners
 Port Douglas Rugby Union
 Southside Crusaders Sports & Culture

Central Highlands Rugby Union
 Capella Rugby Union
 Clermont Rugby Union
 Emerald Rugby
 Moranbah Bulls
 Rolleston Rugby Union

Central Queensland Rugby Union
 Biloela Rugby
 Blackwater Rugby
 Brothers Rugby Union (Rockhampton)
 Capricorn Coast Rugby
 Colts Rugby Club
 Dawson Valley Rugby Club
 Frenchville Pioneers
 Gladstone Rugby Club
 Mount Morgan Rugby
 Rockhampton Boars
 University Central Queensland Rugby

Darling Downs Rugby Union
 Condamine Rugby Union
 Dalby and District Rugby Union Football Club
 Goondiwindi Rugby
 Highfields Redbacks Rugby Union
 Roma Rugby Union
 South Burnett Rugby
 St George & District Rugby
 Toowoomba Bears Rugby
 Toowoomba Rangers Rugby
 University Of Southern Queensland Rugby
 Warwick & Districts Rugby

Mackay District Rugby Union
 Bowen Rugby
 Brothers Rugby Union (Mackay)
 City Rugby Club (Mackay)
 Kuttabul Rugby
 Proserpine/Whitsunday Rugby Union
 Slade Point Rugby

Mt Isa Rugby Union
 Cloncurry Rugby
 Euros Rugby Union
 Keas Rugby
 Warrigals Rugby

Gold Coast and District Rugby Union
 Beaudesert Rugby Football Club
 Bond University Rugby Club
 Bond Pirates Rugby Club
 Casuarina Beach Rugby Club
 Colleges Rugby Club
 Coolangatta Tweed Barbarians
 Coomera Crushers RU
 Gold Coast Eagles
 Griffith Uni Colleges Knights Rugby Union Club
 Helensvale Hogs RUC
 Hinterland Celtics Rugby Club
 Nerang Bulls RUC
 Palm Beach Currumbin Alleygators RUC
 Surfers Paradise Dolphins
 Tamborine Mountain Rugby

Sunshine Coast Rugby Union
 Caboolture Rugby Union
 Caloundra Rugby Union
 Fraser Coast Rugby Union
 Gympie Rugby Union
 Maroochydore Rugby Union
 Nambour Rugby Union
 Noosa District Rugby Union
 University of the Sunshine Coast Rugby Union

Townsville and Districts Rugby Union
 Brothers Rugby Union (Townsville)
 Burdekin Rugby Union
 Charters Towers Rugby Union
 Ingham Rugby Union
 James Cook University of North Queensland Rugby Union
 North Ward Old Boys Rugby
 Ross River Redskins
 Teachers West Rugby Union

Western Queensland Rugby Union
 Barcaldine Rugby Union
 Collegians Rugby Union
 Longreach Rugby Union

See also

Rugby union in Queensland
Queensland Reds
Queensland Country (NRC team)
Queensland Country Heelers
Combined New South Wales–Queensland Country
Queensland Country Championships

References

External links

Rugby union governing bodies in Queensland
1965 establishments in Australia
Sports organizations established in 1965